

The Kingsford Smith PL.7 was an Australian agricultural aircraft designed by Luigi Pellarini and built in the 1950s by Kingsford Smith Aviation Service.

Design and development
The PL.7 was basically a welded steel tank for the pilot and chemical hopper, on the front was mounted a  Armstrong Siddeley Cheetah X radial engine. It was an unequal span biplane with a tail unit supported by twin booms from the upper wings and a fixed tricycle landing gear.

Specifications

References

Notes

Bibliography

1950s Australian agricultural aircraft
Biplanes
Single-engined tractor aircraft
Aircraft first flown in 1956